Metro Building is a station of the Qingdao Metro on Line 3, which opened on 16 December 2015.

References

Qingdao Metro stations
Railway stations in China opened in 2015